Stanley Sweet Hanna (17 May 1920, in Sagaing – 27 December 2012, in Palo Alto, California) was an American physicist.

Stanley Hanna was born in Burma to missionary parents.  At age fourteen he was sent to the Fannie Doane Home for missionary children in Granville, Ohio, where he attended high school and then graduated with A.B. from Denison University in 1941. From 1941 to 1944 he was a graduate student in physics at Johns Hopkins University. From 1945 to 1946 he was in the U.S. Army and worked at Los Alamos. In 1947 he received his Ph.D. from Johns Hopkins University. There he was an instructor from 1946 to 1949 and an assistant professor from 1949 to 1955. He worked at Argonne National Laboratory with pay grade of physicist from 1955 to 1960 and senior physicist from 1960 to 1963. At Stanford University he was a full professor from 1963 to 1990, when he retired as professor emeritus.

Hanna was a Guggenheim Fellow for the academic year 1958–1959, which he spent at the University of Oxford. He held visiting positions at a number of academic institutions around the world.

One of the highlights of his career was his use of the Mossbauer effect to discover the nuclear Zeeman spectrum in 57Fe, the most common isotope of iron.

Hanna was a pioneer in using large sodium iodide crystals to study gamma rays from giant resonances in a variety of nuclei. He and his team pioneered the use polarized protons to precisely measure electric quadrupole and dipole resonances.

Hanna and his team were the first to observe the lowest T = 2 isospin resonances of compound nuclei and their radiative decay.

He was a pioneer of using polarized beams of β-emitting nuclei for important new applications.

In 2016 the Hanna Visiting Professorship was established in his honor. He married Jane Martin on 27 December 1942. Upon his death in 2012 he was survived by his widow, a son, a daughter, four grandchildren, and a great-grandchild. Another son died in 1992.

References

External links

1920 births
2012 deaths
20th-century American physicists
21st-century American physicists
Argonne National Laboratory people
Denison University alumni
Johns Hopkins University alumni
Johns Hopkins University faculty
Stanford University faculty
American expatriates in Myanmar
Fellows of the American Physical Society